The fifth edition of the A3 Champions Cup took place between June 7 and June 13, 2007, at the Shandong Stadium in Jinan.

Participants 
  Seongnam Ilhwa Chunma - 2006 K-League champions.
  Urawa Red Diamonds - 2006 J. League champions.
  Shandong Luneng Taishan - 2006 Chinese Super League champions.
  Shanghai Shenhua - 2006 Chinese Super League runners-up (invitee).

Table

NB: Teams are ranked on goal-difference

Results 

NB: All times are UTC+8.

Round 1

Round 2

Round 3

Awards

Winners

Individual Awards

Goalscorers 

A3
2007
2007
A3
2007 in Chinese football